Neoabolitionism may refer to:

 neo-abolitionism, a Nordic model approach to prostitution law
 Neoabolitionism (race relations), a term used in historiography to characterize historians writing about abolitionists